Cancer immunoprevention is the prevention of cancer onset with immunological means such as vaccines, immunostimulators or antibodies. Cancer immunoprevention is conceptually different from cancer immunotherapy, which aims at stimulating immunity in patients only after tumor onset, however the same immunological means can be used both in immunoprevention and in immunotherapy.

Immunoprevention of tumors caused by viruses
Immunoprevention of tumors caused by viruses or other infectious agents aims at preventing or curing infection before the onset of cancer. Effective vaccines are available for use in humans.
Some tumor types in humans and in animals are the consequence of viral infections. In humans the most frequent viral tumors are liver cancer (also called hepatocellular carcinoma), arising in a small proportion of patients with chronic infection by hepatitis B virus (HBV) or hepatitis C virus (HCV), and carcinoma of the uterine cervix (also called cervical cancer), caused by human papilloma virus (HPV). Altogether these two tumors make 10% of all human cancers, affecting almost one million new patients each year worldwide.
The HBV vaccine, now in worldwide use, was shown to reduce the incidence of liver carcinoma. Cancer immunoprevention by the HBV vaccine can be thought of as a beneficial side effect of vaccine developed and used to prevent hepatitis B. This is not the case with HPV vaccines, which were primarily developed for cancer prevention. Clinical trials showed that HPV vaccines can prevent HPV infection and carcinogenesis almost completely; these results led to vaccine approval by regulatory agencies in USA and Europe.

Immunoprevention of non-infectious tumors
Is it possible to devise immunopreventive strategies for tumors not caused by infectious agents? The challenge is to predict in each individual the risk of specific cancer types and to design immune strategies targeting these cancer types. This is not yet feasible in humans, thus immunoprevention of non-infectious tumors is at a preclinical stage of development.
Effective immunoprevention of various types of cancer was obtained in murine models of cancer risk, in particular in transgenic mice harboring activated oncogenes, thus demonstrating that activation of the immune system in healthy hosts can indeed prevent carcinogenesis. Both non-specific immune stimuli, like cytokines and other immunostimulators, and vaccines containing a specific antigen were active in mouse models; combinations of both types of agents yielded the best results, up to an almost complete, long-term block of carcinogenesis in models of aggressive cancer development.

Immune mechanisms
Two main protective mechanisms elicited by cancer immunoprevention in various mouse models were cytokines released by T cells, in particular gamma-interferon, and cytotoxic antibodies against the target antigen. This is at variance with cancer immunotherapy administered to cure existing tumors, which is mainly based on cytotoxic T lymphocytes (CTL). The lack of a relevant CTL response in long-term immunoprevention is thought to be an advantage, because chronic CTL activation is severely toxic for the host. In contrast circulating antibodies provide long-term protection without toxic side effects. A similar situation happens in viral immunity, acute infections are resolved by CTL, whereas long term immunity from reinfection is provided by antibodies.
Both gamma-interferon and antibodies prevent tumor growth in multiple ways. Gamma-interferon activates T, natural killer and B cells, inhibits angiogenesis and tumor invasiveness, stimulates major histocompatibility complex expression in tumor cells and inhibits cell proliferation. Antibodies binding to antigens on the surface of cells trigger lytic mechanisms mediated by the complement system (complement-mediated cytotoxicity) or by leukocytes carrying Fc receptors (antibody-dependent cell-mediated cytotoxicity, ADCC). Moreover, antibody binding interferes with the cellular functions of the target antigen, causing its internalization or hampering molecular interactions, eventually blocking downstream signaling. If the target antigen controls cell growth (e.g. if it is the product of an oncogene), then a block of signaling can disrupt the carcinogenic process. Surface antigens causally involved in carcinogenesis are called oncoantigens.

Clinical development and risks
The success of cancer immunoprevention in preclinical models suggests that it might have an impact also in humans. The main problems to be solved are the definition of appropriate human applications and of the risks for human health.
Application to the general population, as is being done for vaccines against HBV and HPV, is currently unfeasible, because it would require a precise individual prediction of the risk of cancer. Subgroups at high risk of developing a defined type of tumor, for example families with hereditary cancer or individuals with preneoplastic lesions, are the natural candidates for immunoprevention of non-infectious tumors. It has also been suggested that immunopreventive strategies can have therapeutic effects against metastases, hence early human trials could aim at cancer therapy rather than prevention.
The main risk of prolonged immune stimulation for cancer prevention is the development of autoimmune diseases. Most antitumor immune responses are autoimmune, because most tumor antigens are also expressed by normal cells, but it must be considered that autoimmune responses do not necessarily evolve into autoimmune diseases. The limited autoimmunity triggered by cancer immunoprevention did not cause overt autoimmune diseases in preclinical mouse studies, however this is an issue that will require careful monitoring in early clinical trials.

References

Oncology
Immunology